Stig Johannes Carlsson (17 January 1924 – 14 December 1978) was a Swedish ice hockey player. He competed in the men's tournaments at the 1948 Winter Olympics and the 1956 Summer Olympics.

References

External links
 

1924 births
1978 deaths
Ice hockey players at the 1948 Winter Olympics
Ice hockey players at the 1956 Winter Olympics
Olympic ice hockey players of Sweden
Ice hockey people from Stockholm